Eosinophil-derived neurotoxin is an enzyme that in humans is encoded by the RNASE2 gene.

The protein encoded by this gene is found in eosinophil granulocytes. It is closely related to the eosinophil cationic protein (RNASE3) from which it diverged ~50 million years ago after the split between the old world and the new world monkeys. It is relatively neutral and has cytotoxic properties. It is capable of reducing the activity of single strand RNA viruses in culture through its enzymatic activity. It also serves as an attractant to immune cells.

See also
 Ribonuclease A

References

Further reading

External links
 
 
 PDBe-KB provides an overview of all the structure information available in the PDB for Human Eosinophil-derived neurotoxin